Berle is a surname. Notable people with the surname include:

Adolf A. Berle (1895–1971), American educator and diplomat
Jon Berle (1932–2010), Norwegian actor, dancer, and choreographer
Milton Berle (1908–2002), American comedian and actor
Peter A. A. Berle (1937–2007), American lawyer and politician

See also
Berl (name)
Emmanuel Berl (1892–1976), French journalist, historian, and essayist
Lucy Burle (born 1955), Brazilian international freestyle and butterfly swimmer